is a Japanese rugby union player who plays as a Fly-half or Centre. He currently plays for NTT Communications Shining Arcs in Japan's domestic Top League.

International
Japan head coach Jamie Joseph has named Doga Maeda in a 52-man training squad ahead of British and Irish Lions test.

References

External Links
itsrugby.co.uk Profile
ESPN Rugby Profile

1996 births
Living people
People from Nagasaki Prefecture
Sportspeople from Nagasaki Prefecture
Japanese rugby union players
Rugby union centres
Urayasu D-Rocks players
Rugby union fly-halves
Japan international rugby union players
Green Rockets Tokatsu players